Liam Connor Norwell (born 27 December 1991) is an English cricketer who currently plays for Warwickshire. A right-handed batsman and right-hand medium pace bowler he made his first-class debut for Gloucestershire against Derbyshire in April 2011. Norwell signed a new two-year contract for Gloucestershire in 2013.

County career
Born in Bournemouth, Dorset, Norwell made his first-class debut for Gloucestershire in April 2011 against Derbyshire as a 19-year-old. In the first innings Norwell made 19 runs before being run out by Tim Groenewald helping Gloucestershire to 343. In the Derbyshire first innings, Norwell produced an impressive display bowling 11 overs taking 6 wickets for just 46 runs as he helped bowl Derbyshire out for just 157. This remains to this day his best first-class bowling performance. In the second innings Norwell managed 1 wicket, that of Wayne Madsen to take match figures of 7–112 as Gloucestershire won by 7 wickets. Norwell followed up this performance with an appearance in the following first-class game against Glamorgan. Norwell took 2 wickets for 49 runs in the first innings helping bowl out Glamorgan for 202. He scored 11 not out in the reply and was wicketless in the second as Gloucestershire lost by 189 runs. Norwell then appeared for Gloucestershire in a drawn match against Middlesex. He opened the bowling in the Middlesex innings along with captain Jon Lewis and took 3 wickets for 102 runs, dismissing Middlesex for 406.

Norwell was hit by injuries in 2013, but coach John Bracewell saw enough for Norwell to be offered a new contract, which he signed through to the end of the 2015 season.

Career best performances
as of 29 September 2022

References

External links
 
 Liam Norwell Gloucestershire Profile

1991 births
Living people
English cricketers
Gloucestershire cricketers
Warwickshire cricketers
Sportspeople from Bournemouth
Cricketers from Dorset
Cornwall cricketers